Charles Bernard English (1902–1974) was a politician in Queensland, Australia. He was a Member of the Queensland Legislative Assembly.

Early life
Charles English was born 30 January 1902 as Goonengerry near Lismore, New South Wales, the son of James English and his wife Catherine Jane (née Buckley). The family moved to the Atherton Tableland in 1904, and he was educated at Malanda, Queensland and at Mount Carmel College, Charters Towers, Queensland. He married Mona Annie Evelyn McConnell on 2 June 1926; the couple had 4 daughters. He was a sawmill owner and tobacco farmer.

Politics
English won the seat of Mulgrave in the 1953 election as the Labor Party candidate, entering the Queensland Legislative Assembly. He held the seat in the 1956 election. On 26 April 1957, he followed Queensland Premier Vince Gair when he broke away from the ALP and formed the Queensland Labor Party (QLP). However, he was defeated at the 1957 election by Robert Watson, the Country Party candidate.

English contested Mulgrave again in the 1960 and 1963 elections but was not successful.

Later life
English died on 5 August 1974 in Brisbane. He was buried in Pinnaroo Cemetery on 7 August 1974.

See also
 Members of the Queensland Legislative Assembly, 1953–1956
 Members of the Queensland Legislative Assembly, 1956–1957
 Candidates of the Queensland state election, 1960
 Candidates of the Queensland state election, 1963

References

Members of the Queensland Legislative Assembly
1902 births
1974 deaths
Burials at Pinnaroo Cemetery, Brisbane
Australian Labor Party members of the Parliament of Queensland
Queensland Labor Party members of the Parliament of Queensland
20th-century Australian politicians